Tanner Thompson (born August 12, 1994) is an American former professional soccer player, who is currently an assistant coach for the Indiana Hoosiers men's soccer program.

Career

Youth and college
Thompson attended the Indiana University for four years, where he was a 3x All American for the Hoosiers. With the Hoosiers, Thompsons scored 18 goals in 83 appearances, while also recording 19 assists.

He was named NSCAA First Team All-American twice (2014 & 2016), and NSCAA Third Team All-American once in 2015. Thompson was 2x Big Ten Conference Midfielder of the Year (2015 & 2016), and a 2x MAC-Hermann Trophy Semifinalist (2014 & 2016). He was also a 3x NSCAA First Team All-Midwest Region (2014-2016) and a part of the First Team All-Big Ten Conference Team on three occasions (2014, 2015, and 2016).

He was also nominated for the senior class award in 2016.

Professional 
Thompson was drafted in the fourth round, 67th overall, in the 2017 MLS SuperDraft by Minnesota United on January 17, 2017. However, he wasn't signed by the club. Thompson later signed with NASL club Indy Eleven on March 21, 2017.

Thompson made his professional debut on March 25, 2017, in a 1-1 draw with San Francisco Deltas, where he also recorded his first goal.

Personal 
Tanner's young brother is fellow soccer player Tommy, who currently plays for San Jose Earthquakes in Major League Soccer. His father is former-United States international soccer player Gregg Thompson.

References 

1994 births
Living people
American soccer players
Indiana Hoosiers men's soccer players
Indy Eleven players
Association football midfielders
Minnesota United FC draft picks
North American Soccer League players
Soccer players from Illinois
All-American men's college soccer players